Thauria lathyi, the jungleking, is a butterfly found in South Asia that belongs to the Morphinae subfamily of the brush-footed butterflies family.

Distribution
The jungleking ranges from Manipur to southern Myanmar. and Indochina.

A related species, the tufted jungleking (Thauria aliris Frühstorfer, 1902) occurs in Asia.

Status
Evans reports the butterfly as rare in its range.

Etymology
The name honours Percy Ireland Lathy.

See also
List of butterflies of India
List of butterflies of India (Morphinae)
List of butterflies of India (Nymphalidae)

Cited references

References
 
 

Amathusiini
Butterflies of Asia
Butterflies of Indochina